Omar Abdulmuhsin Al-Tabtabaee (Arabic: عمر الطبطبائي) (born 1980) is a politician, who was an elected Member of Parliament of the Kuwait Parliament. As the Kuwaiti General Election 2016 was his first stand for elections, he won the tenth chair in the second constituency by 1,755 votes.

Al-Tabtabaee contributed in the following parliamentary committees:
 Education, Culture and Guidance Affairs Committee
 Public Money Protection Committee

References 

1980 births
Living people
Members of the National Assembly (Kuwait)
Gulf University for Science and Technology alumni
University of Colorado Denver alumni